Butsneve in a village in Khmelnytskyi Raion, Khmelnytskyi Oblast, Ukraine.

According to the 2001 Ukrainian Census, the population was 409 (down from 488 in 1989).

History

The 1880 Geographical Dictionary of the Kingdom of Poland says that Bucniowa (or Bucniów), was included in  gmina Derażnia of powiat latyczowski (Letichevsky Uyezd, Podolian Governorate, Russian Empire), with population of 554, including 54 persons of odnodvortsy (petty szlachta deprived of nobility in Russian Empire). It should not be confused with Bucniowce (Буцневцы, Butsnevtsy) situated in a close location.

Notes

References

Villages in Khmelnytskyi Raion